The Spectrum Beaver is a family of single- and two-place, pusher configuration, high-wing ultralight aircraft that were first introduced by Spectrum Aircraft of Surrey, British Columbia, Canada, in 1983.

Beaver ultralights have evolved as designs over time, have been produced by several companies and remain in production in the 21st century.

Development
The first model Beaver was the RX-28, a simple lightweight single-seat aircraft that was intended to comply with the US FAR 103 Ultralight Vehicles category, including the category's maximum  empty weight. The model designation indicated that it was Rotax-28 hp as it was powered by the  Rotax 277 single-cylinder, two-stroke powerplant.

The availability of the  Rotax 377 engine led to a higher-powered version of the RX-28, which was designated the RX-35. This Beaver model was fitted with floats and continued in production by Spectrum Aircraft until they ceased business in 1992.

Building on the success of the single-seat Beaver models, Spectrum Aircraft introduced the two-place Beaver RX 550 in 1986, and it quickly became the most popular ultralight trainer in Canada. The combination of its predictable and docile handling, along with the reliable Rotax 503  engine, ensured its success.

Intending to improve on the RX 550, Spectrum introduced the Beaver RX 650 in 1991, intending to place it in the Advanced Ultra-light Aeroplane category (AULA) in Canada. The RX 650 has doors that fold upwards, making it ideal for use on floats. The cockpit cage was changed to welded steel tube, from the previously used aluminum, and a sprung tailwheel was added. In service, the 650 quickly proved to have structural issues and its acceptance in the AULA category was rescinded by Transport Canada until the issues could be rectified. Most customer 650s were kept flying by operating them in the Basic Ultra-light Aeroplane category. Spectrum Aircraft went out of business in 1992, prior to rectifying the issues with the 650.

A new company, Beaver RX Enterprises acquired the design and commenced production of the RX 550, placing it in the AULA category. They did not produce the single-seaters or the RX 650. Despite demand for the Beaver, the company soon went out of business.

Fun Flight Inc of Alexandria, Virginia, United States, also produced the RX550 model in the late 1990s.

In 1995, Aircraft Sales and Parts (ASAP) of Vernon, British Columbia, purchased the Beaver tooling and redesigned the RX 550. The new version, designated the RX 550 Plus, incorporated a new wing with a greater number of wing ribs and standard aircraft fabric replacing the Dacron covering. The ASAP RX 550 Plus remains in production and available in kit form. It can be registered in the Canadian Basic and Advanced ultralight categories as well as in the US and Canadian amateur-built aircraft categories. By the end of 2007, a total of 2000 RX 550s had been produced by all manufacturers.

In 1996, a new company, Freedom Lite of Walton, Ontario, reintroduced the Beaver RX 650, first displaying it at Sun 'n Fun that year. The improved RX 650 incorporated 186 changes over the previous RX 650 design and the company renamed it the Freedom Lite SS-11 Skywatch. The wings use conventional aircraft fabric instead of Dacron, giving build times of about 250 hours. The company placed the aircraft in the Canadian AULA category. Freedom Lite soon went out of business, and the design was acquired by Legend Lite of New Hamburg, Ontario. This new company also closed its doors in the early 2000s.

In 2000, the manufacturer of RX 550 Plus kits, ASAP, reintroduced a single-seat version of the Beaver, designated the Beaver SS (Single Seat). This is similar to the original RX-28, but powered by a  Rotax 447 engine and with a wing derived from the RX 550 Plus design, with additional ribs. The new wing is covered in standard aircraft fabric and incorporates drag tubes in place of the original drag wires. In Canada, it can be flown in the basic ultralight category or amateur-built. By the end of 2007, ten had been completed and flown.

Design
The Beaver family of aircraft all have similar construction, with the frame fuselage constructed around a single longitudinal 6061-T6 aluminum tube that supports the tail, landing gear and seats. The wings and engine mount are similarly of 6061-T6 aluminum tube and attached to the main tube by connecting struts. The wing features aluminum tube spars and ribs. All Beavers prior to the RX 550 Plus and the SS had pre-sewn Dacron envelopes, which enabled builders to complete the kits in as little as 100 hours. The later models use conventional fabric methods and this makes the factory-claimed build times 150–200 hours for the SS and 180–200 hours to the RX 550 Plus.

All Beaver wings are swept-back and have elliptical tips. The Plus wing differs from the earlier Beaver wings in that it replaces the internal drag wires with tubes and uses many more ribs to maintain a better airfoil shape, at the cost of additional weight and complexity. The SS and RX 550 Plus wings have 3/4 span ailerons. All models have conventional three-axis controls.

The landing gear is of tricycle configuration. Earlier models did not have a steerable nosewheel, but the SS and RX 550 Plus include this feature. Most models have independent mechanical or hydraulic brakes.

The cockpit pod enclosure is made of fiberglass and incorporates a windshield.

Operational history
The Beaver has proven very popular in service, both with flight schools and private owners, due to its ruggedness and pleasant handling characteristics. ASAP owner Brent Holomis says that "The RX-550 is often used as a trainer because it's so easy to fly."

The early single seat RX-28 suffered from a problem of main tube cracking in operational service, due to the close proximity of the muffler heating the tube. This was later resolved by relocating the muffler.

Variants
Beaver RX-28
Single-seat, powered by a  Rotax 277, produced by Spectrum Aircraft.
Beaver RX-35
Single-seat, powered by a  Rotax 377, produced by Spectrum Aircraft.
Beaver RX-550
Two-seat, powered by a  Rotax 503, produced by Spectrum Aircraft.
Beaver RX-550 Plus
Two-seat, powered by a  Rotax 503 or  Rotax 582, produced by ASAP.
Beaver RX-650
Two-seat, powered by a  Rotax 503 or  Rotax 582, produced by Spectrum Aircraft and Beaver RX Enterprises.
SS-11 Skywatch
Two-seat, powered by a  Rotax 503 or  Rotax 582, produced by Freedom Lite and Legend Lite.
Beaver SS
Single-seat, powered by a  Rotax 447,  Rotax 503 or  Zanzottera MZ 201, produced by ASAP.

Aircraft on display
 
Spectrum Beaver RX 550 C-IGOW is on display in the storage wing of the Canada Aviation and Space Museum. In 1986 this aircraft was flown  from Halifax to land at Expo '86 in Vancouver by Carl Hiebert, a Canadian paraplegic pilot, to raise awareness of disability issues. The story of the journey was published as a book by Hiebert under the title Gift of Wings.

Specifications (Beaver SS)

See also

References

External links

1980s Canadian ultralight aircraft
Homebuilt aircraft
Single-engined pusher aircraft